Ritvars Rugins (born 17 October 1989]) is a Latvian footballer who most recently played for Riga FC in the Latvian Higher League and Latvia national football team.

Club career

Early career and FK Ventspils

Ritvars Rugins started playing football at the age of 9 in his local club Tukums 2000. In 2007, he joined the Latvian Higher League club FK Ventspils. In 2008, he played his first league match for the team, it was his only appearance that season. In 2009, he played 14 games and scored twice. In 2010, he scored 3 goals in 22 games. Year 2011 saw him playing 29 matches and scoring 4 times. During that season Rugins was tried out in different positions, as the coach Sergei Podpaly faced a lack of defenders all season long. Ritvars usually plays as a midfielder, but periodically has also been part of the defensive and attacking lines, being described as a very universal player. Rugins is a three-time Latvian champion and has also won the Latvian Cup and Baltic League - each once respectively.

Illichivets Mariupol

On 9 January 2012 Rugins signed a contract with the Ukrainian Premier League club Illichivets Mariupol. He made his league debut for the club on 10 March 2012, coming on as a substitute in the 72nd minute against Shakhtar Donetsk.

Skonto Riga

In July 2012, Rugins returned to the Latvian Higher League, signing for Skonto Riga.

Riga FC
Rugins signed with Riga FC on 7 January 2019. Rugins departed the club at the end of the 2022 season.

International career

Rugins played for Latvia U-21 until 2010, scoring once in 12 matches. He made his debut for the national team in a friendly match against China (0–1) on 17 November 2010. As of August, 2012, Rugins has been capped 8 times for the national side.

Honours

FK Ventspils
 Latvian champion
 2008, 2011
 Latvian Cup winner
 2011, 2017
 Baltic League champion
 2010

Riga FC
 Latvian champion
 2019, 2020

National team
 Baltic Cup winner
 2014, 2018

References

External links
 
 
 

1989 births
Living people
People from Tukums
Latvian footballers
Latvian expatriate footballers
Latvia international footballers
FK Ventspils players
Skonto FC players
Riga FC players
Expatriate footballers in Ukraine
Latvian expatriate sportspeople in Ukraine
FC Mariupol players
Association football defenders
Association football midfielders